PMS Clan (previously short for Psychotic Man Slayerz, now short for Pandora's Mighty Soldiers) is an all-female multi-platform online gaming group. It was founded in 2002 to provide a competitive, fun and positive environment for female gamers, and is one of the largest all-female gaming groups in the world.

History 
PMS Clan was founded by Amber Dalton and Amy Brady, also known by their gamertags as “Athena Twin” and “Athena/Valkyrie” respectively. Initially called Psychotic Man Slayers, in two years they changed for Pandora’s Mighty Soldiers as they began landing sponsors and getting opposition for its name.

In various interviews the PMS Clan members stated their mission as changing the perception that competitive online and offline gaming is dominated by male hardcore gamers.

In order to join the clan female gamers have to join a division featuring a game that allows for online matches and tournaments. The games vary from Massively multiplayer online role playing games, to racing and shooters.

In 2004, the PMS Clan expended their presence online by forming a PlayStation division. The same year an EU Division was launched.

In 2006, the PMS Clan became a partner of Verizon for FiOS Grand Tournament. The same year Women in Technology International, a professional organization for tech-savyy women, selected the PMS to be their gaming ambassadors.

From 2007 to 2008 the Clan expended to the Latin America, Asia and Oceania regions.

In 2008, Alienware, a manufacturer of high-performance notebook, desktop and entertainment system, became the PMS Clan's official PC sponsor providing PMS Clan members with Alienware Area-51® m9750 notebooks for training.

In 2013 Regina Wu assumed the management of PMS Clan.

Members 
As of 2008, the PMS Clan had over 1,000 members on multiple platforms and five continents. As stated on their website entire PMS Clan community is reaching 60,000 women and allies. The age of the PMS Clan members ranges from 13 to 51 years old.

See also 
 Asterisk, previously known as PMS Asterisk
 Frag Dolls
 Women and video games

References

External links 

 All-Girl Quake Clans Shake Up Boys' World
 Women Stepping Up Their Game
 This IT girl's got game: Kendra Taylor, PMS Clan leader and systems engineer
 The PMS Clan (You Go, Girl!!)

External links 
 

2002 establishments in the United States
Esports teams based in the United States
American gaming websites